Kemrock Industries and Exports Limited was an Indian public company specializing in the manufacture of fiber-reinforced composite materials. Established in 1981, the company was based in Vadodara, Gujarat.

Products
Kemrock manufactured fibre-reinforced plastic and glass-reinforced plastic composite products for the domestic and export markets. It focused on industrial segments, such as aerospace, renewable energy, railways, chemical processing, waste management, etc.

Kemrock commissioned India's first carbon fiber production facility in 2010, under a technology transfer from the Council of Scientific and Industrial Research and National Aerospace Laboratories. Initial capacity at its plant in Vadodara was 400 tonnes of carbon fiber each year. It was one of the prime producers of FRP & GRP items.

Kemrock was acquired by Reliance Industries Ltd. in September 2017.

References

External links
 

Companies based in Vadodara
Indian companies disestablished in 2017
Indian companies established in 1981
Plastics companies of India
1981 establishments in Gujarat
Manufacturing companies established in 1981
Manufacturing companies disestablished in 2017
Companies listed on the National Stock Exchange of India
Companies listed on the Bombay Stock Exchange